Nehbandan County or Nahbandan County (Shahrestān-e Nahbandān) is in South Khorasan province, Iran. The capital of the county is the city of Nehbandan. At the 2006 census, the county's population was 56,089, in 13,541 households. The folowing census in 2011 counted 57,258 people in 15,025 households. At the 2016 census, the county's population was 51,449 in 14,185 households.

Administrative divisions

The population history of Nehbandan County's administrative divisions over three consecutive censuses is shown in the following table. The latest census shows two districts, five rural districts, and two cities.

References

 

Counties of South Khorasan Province